Trajko Prokopiev (6 November 1909 – 21 January 1979) was a Yugoslav Macedonian composer.

See also
List of people from Kumanovo

References

People from Kumanovo
1909 births
1979 deaths
Yugoslav composers
Male composers
20th-century male musicians